Rhopalobrachium was a genus of flowering plants in the family Rubiaceae but is no longer recognized. It has been sunk into synonymy with Cyclophyllum. It was originally described by Rudolf Schlechter and Kurt Krause in 1908 to accommodate two New Caledonian species, R. congestum and R. fragrans. No type species was selected.

Former species 
 Rhopalobrachium congestum Schltr. & K.Krause = Aidia congesta
 Rhopalobrachium fragrans Schltr. & K.Krause = Cyclophyllum fragrans
 Rhopalobrachium megacarpum (Kaneh.) Kaneh. = Atractocarpus carolinensis

References

External links 
 World Checklist of Rubiaceae

Historically recognized Rubiaceae genera
Vanguerieae